The 2016 International League season began on April 7 and ended on September 5, 2016. Following the regular season, the Governors' Cup playoffs were played from September 7–17, 2016.

The 2016 Triple-A All-Star Game was held on Wednesday, July 13 at BB&T Ballpark in Charlotte, North Carolina, home of the Charlotte Knights. The International League All-Stars defeated the Pacific Coast League All-Stars, 4–2, for their twelfth win in the series.

The Scranton/Wilkes-Barre RailRiders defeated the Gwinnett Braves, 3 games to 1, to win their second Governors' Cup. 

The RailRaiders went on to defeat the El Paso Chihuahuas, 3–1, in the 2016 Triple-A Baseball National Championship Game at AutoZone Park in Memphis, Tennessee.

Teams

Standings

North Division

South Division

West Division

Playoffs

Bracket

Semifinals

Scranton/Wilkes-Barre vs. Lehigh Valley

Gwinnett Braves vs. Columbus Clippers

Governors' Cup Finals

Scranton/Wilkes-Barre RailRiders vs. Gwinnett Braves

Attendance

References

External links
International League official website 

International League seasons